Andrei Vasilyevich Kozlov (born 15 September 1973) is a Russian football manager and a former player. He is the manager of FC Arsenal-2 Tula.

External links
 

1973 births
People from Belgorod
Living people
Soviet footballers
Russian footballers
FC SKA Rostov-on-Don players
FC Rostov players
Russian Premier League players
FC Saturn Ramenskoye players
FC Lokomotiv Nizhny Novgorod players
FC Amkar Perm players
FC Rubin Kazan players
FC Fakel Voronezh players
FC SKA-Khabarovsk players
FC Dynamo Stavropol players
Khazar Lankaran FK players
Russian expatriate footballers
Expatriate footballers in Azerbaijan
Russian football managers
FC SKA Rostov-on-Don managers
FC Arsenal Tula managers
Russian Premier League managers
Association football forwards
FC Shinnik Yaroslavl players
FC Oryol players
FC Chayka Peschanokopskoye players
Sportspeople from Belgorod Oblast